HMS Vanquisher (D54) was a V-class destroyer of the British Royal Navy that saw service in World War I and World War II.

Construction and commissioning

Vanquisher, the first Royal Navy ship of the name, was ordered on 30 June 1916 as part of the 9th Order of the 1916–17 Naval Programme. She was laid down on 27 September 1916 by John Brown & Company at Clydebank, Scotland, and fitted to carry 60 naval mines by order of the British Admiralty on 12 January 1917. She was launched on 18 or 28 August 1917 (sources vary) and was commissioned on 2 October 1917.

Service history

World War I
Upon completion, V- and W-class destroyers, including Vanquisher, were assigned to the Grand Fleet or Harwich Force Vanquisher saw service in the last year of World War I.

On 1 August 1918, Vanquisher was operating as part of the 20th Destroyer Flotilla when the flotilla departed the Humber estuary to lay a minefield in the North Sea at the outer end of one of the German-swept channels through the German minefield in the Heligoland Bight. At 23:47 hours the force was within 20 nautical miles (37 km) of the area it was to mine when the destroyer  struck a mine. Its explosion caused Vehements forward ammunition magazine to detonate, blowing off the entire forward section of the ship forward of the forward funnel, killing one officer and 47 ratings. As the force manoeuvered to clear the minefield, the destroyer  also struck a mine at 00:10 hours on 2 August and, in a repeat of what had happened to Vehement, suffered a magazine detonation that blew off the entire section of the ship forward of the whaleboats davit. Ariel sank at about 01:00 hours on 2 August, with the loss of four officers and 45 ratings, but Vehement remained afloat, and by about an hour after she struck the mine her crew had put out all of her fires. She was taken in tow by the destroyer  in the hope of saving her, but at 04:00 hours on 2 August Vehements stern rose into the air, making further towing impossible. Vehements surviving crew opened all of her hull valves to speed her sinking and abandoned ship, and Vanquisher and the destroyer  then sank Vehement with gunfire.

German forces did not interfere with the operations.

Interwar years
The ships crossed the North Sea, transited the Kaiser Wilhelm Canal to enter the Baltic, and called at Danzig in the Free City of Danzig; Memel in the Klaipėda Region; Liepāja, Latvia; Riga, Latvia; Tallinn, Estonia; Helsinki, Finland; Stockholm, Sweden; Copenhagen, Denmark; Gothenburg, Sweden; and Kristiania, Norway, before crossing the North Sea and ending the voyage at Port Edgar, Scotland, on 15 October 1921.

During the 1920s and 1930s, Vanquisher was assigned to the Atlantic Fleet and Mediterranean Fleet, and in 1938 she was attached to the 1st Antisubmarine Flotilla at Portland, England.

World War II

1939
Vanquisher, Walker, and Winchelsea escorted Convoy OB 2 on 9 September 1939, and were returning to Plymouth from this duty when Vanquisher and Walker collided in the North Atlantic Ocean about 200 nautical miles (370 km) southwest of Cape Clear Island, Ireland, on 10 or 11 September 1939 (sources differ). Both ships suffered heavy damage, and Vanquisher had to be towed back to port; Walker, able to proceed under her own power, took casualties from Vanquisher aboard for transportation to the United Kingdom. Walker was under repair until mid-November 1939, but Vanquishers repairs were not complete until early January 1940.

1940

 
In January 1940, Vanquisher underwent post-repair acceptance trials, then returned to convoy defence operations in the Western Approaches with the 11th Destroyer Flotilla, later being reassigned to the English Channel and Southwestern Approaches. In May 1940 she was again reassigned, this time under the Commander-in-Chief, Dover to take part in Operation Dynamo, the evacuation of Allied troops from Dunkirk, France, which she joined on 28 May 1940. She made seven trips between Dunkirk and Dover, England, carrying 241 troops in a voyage on 29 May 582 and 622 troops in two trips on 30 May, 640 and 168 troops in two voyages on 1 June 1940, and 37 and 414 troops in two trips on 3 June 1940.
On 12 June 1940 she joined the escort of the French battleship Jean Bart on Jean Barts voyage from Saint-Nazaire, France, to Casablanca, French Morocco, then on 19 June 1940 steamed to Saint-Nazaire to take part in Operation Aerial, the evacuation of British Expeditionary Force personnel from French ports on the Bay of Biscay. On 20 June 1940, she embarked a demolition party and steamed to La Pallice to destroy port facilities there, but did not land the team. She returned to the United Kingdom at Plymouth on 22 June 1940.

In September 1940, she was reassigned to the 8th Escort Group at Liverpool for convoy escort operations in the North Atlantic, and that month was part of the escort for Convoy OB 216. In November 1940, she and the rest of the 8th Escort Group was assigned to the Gibraltar-United Kingdom convoy route and deployed to the Gibraltar area as an antisubmarine hunting group continuing this duty into 1941.

1941

Later in the month, she was transferred to Freetown in Sierra Leone to take part in local convoy escort duties there. From 13 to 19 June 1941 she and the destroyers  and  escorted Convoy WS 9A during the final segment of its voyage to Freetown, and from 20 to 22 June 1941 the same three destroyers and the destroyer  escorted WS 9A on the first leg of the next stage of its voyage as it steamed from Freetown for the Middle East via the Cape of Good Hope before they detached from the convoy to return to Freetown. From 16 to 18 July 1941, Vanquisher, Boreas, Velox, and the destroyer  similarly escorted Convoy WS 9B after its departure from Freetown for the Cape of Good Hope before detaching and returning to Freetown.

Vanquisher was transferred to the 10th Escort Group and returned to the United Kingdom in October 1941, and in November 1941 – the month in which she was "adopted" by the civil community of Nuneaton, Warwickshire, in a Warship Week National Savings campaign – she began convoy escort operations in the Northwestern Approaches. From 14 to 15 December 1941, Vanquisher, Volunteer, and Witch escorted Convoy WS 14 during a portion of its voyage from the Clyde to Freetown, then returned to the Clyde.

1942

On 12 January 1942, Vanquisher, Vanoc, Volunteer, Walker, and the destroyer  departed the Clyde as the local escort for Convoy WS 15, staying with it during its transit of the Western Approaches until relieved by the Royal Australian Navy destroyer  and the Polish Navy destroyer ORP Garland on 17 January 1942, after which she and rest of the local escort detached and returned to the Clyde.

In February 1942, Vanquisher was detached from the 8th Escort Group to operate with the 1st Minelaying Squadron, and on 18 February she escorted the squadrons ships during a minelaying sortie in the Northern Barrage in Operation SN84.  She then returned to her escort group to continue convoy defence operations.

In September 1942, Vanquisher entered Portsmouth Dockyard for conversion into a long-range escort. The conversion lasted into 1943.

1943

In April 1943, Vanquisher underwent post-conversion acceptance trials, then conducted workups to prepare for operations in the North Atlantic. On 15 October 1943, ON 206 came under sustained attack by German submarines, and on 16 October Vanquisher, Duncan, and Vidette drove off the submarine U-844, which made a determined effort to attack the convoy.

1944

Vanquisher continued her North Atlantic convoy operations into 1944, and escorted Convoy ONS 29 with the rest of the 6th Escort Group during February 1944. On 5 June, the landings were delayed for 24 hours due to bad weather, but on 6 June, the day of the initial landings, Vanquisher and the other ships of her convoy moved to ports on the south coast of England, where the motor transport ships were loaded. On 7 June, the convoy made its passage to the beachhead, and on 8 June it arrived off the invasion beaches and discharged its cargo. On 10 June, Vanquisher began escorting convoys carrying reinforcements and supplies from Falmouth to the beachhead, continuing in this role until Operation Neptune concluded toward the end of June. She then returned to the 6th Escort Group and escorted North Atlantic convoys for the rest of 1944 and into 1945.

1945

In April 1945, Vanquisher was part of the escort for Convoy ONA 265.

After the surrender of Germany in early May 1945, the Royal Navy withdrew Vanquisher from service.

Decommissioning and disposal
Vanquisher was decommissioned in June 1945 and placed in reserve. Placed on the disposal list in 1947, she was sold on 4 March or 4 May 1947 (sources differ) to BISCO for scrapping by Metal Industries. She arrived under tow at the shipbreakers yard at Charlestown, Fife, Scotland, in October 1948.

Notes

Bibliography

External links
Naval History: HMS VANQUISHER (D 54)  -  V & W-class Destroyer
uboat.net HMS Vanquisher (D 54)

 

V and W-class destroyers of the Royal Navy
Ships built on the River Clyde
1917 ships
World War I destroyers of the United Kingdom
World War II destroyers of the United Kingdom
Maritime incidents in September 1939